Westmorland County Council was the county council of Westmorland in north west England. It came into its powers on 1 April 1889 and was abolished on 1 April 1974. The county council was initially based at the Town Hall in Kendal and then, from 1939, based at the County Offices in Kendal. It was amalgamated with Cumberland County Council to form the new Cumbria County Council in 1974.

References

Former county councils of England
1889 establishments in England
1974 disestablishments in England
County Council